Judge Henry Shippen House, also known as the Red Cross Building, is a historic home located at Meadville, Crawford County, Pennsylvania.  It was built in 1838 and remodeled and expanded in 1875.  It is a -story, brick dwelling with a mansard roof in the Second Empire style. It is three bays by six bays, and was originally in the Federal style.

It was added to the National Register of Historic Places in 1984.

References

Houses on the National Register of Historic Places in Pennsylvania
Second Empire architecture in Pennsylvania
Houses completed in 1838
Houses in Crawford County, Pennsylvania
Meadville, Pennsylvania
National Register of Historic Places in Crawford County, Pennsylvania